Claude Kalisa (born 6 March 1977 in Muyira) is a Rwandan former professional football defender. Along with teammate Désiré Mbonabucya, Kalisa formed the backbone of the Rwandan national team that participated in the 2004 African Nations Cup.

Career
Kalisa began playing professional football in China with Yanbian Century, and spent the last six seasons of his career in Belgium with K. Sint-Truidense V.V. He retired due to a knee injury in 2007.

Personal
Kalisa's father was killed during the Civil War in his home country of Rwanda.

Clubs
1996–1997:  Rayon Sport
1998–1999:  Yanbian Century
1999–2001:  Rayon Sport
2001–2007:  Sint-Truiden

References

External links

1977 births
Living people
Rwandan footballers
Rwandan expatriate footballers
Sint-Truidense V.V. players
Rwanda international footballers
Yanbian Funde F.C. players
Expatriate footballers in China
Expatriate footballers in Belgium
Rwandan expatriate sportspeople in Belgium
Rayon Sports F.C. players
Association football defenders
People from Nyanza District